The Members of Bund Schweizerischer Frauenvereine (BSF) comprises as of November 2014 more than 150 nationwide member organizations, listed by name and year of participation.

See also 
 Bund Schweizerischer Frauenvereine (BSF)

References

External links 
  
 2020 – Der weibliche Blick auf die Zukunft 

Women's organisations based in Switzerland
Feminist organisations in Switzerland
Switzerland-related lists